The Alexander Hollaender Award in Biophysics is awarded by the U.S. National Academy of Sciences  "for outstanding contributions in biophysics". Named in honor of Alexander Hollaender, it has been awarded every three years since 1998.

Recipients of Alexander Hollaender Award in Biophysics 
Source: National Academy of Sciences
 Jane S. Richardson (2019)
"For her innovative contributions to assess quality and accuracy of macromolecular structures through the development of methods for the analysis, representation, and validation of atomic models. Her ribbon representations of protein structures have made them easily comprehensible by the entire scientific community."
 Richard Henderson (2016)
"For his pioneering work in the determination of atomic structure of a macromolecule by electron microscopy (EM)."
 King-Wai Yau (2013)
"For innovative, rigorous, and fundamental contributions to the biophysics of sensory transduction in rod, cone, and non-image visual systems and in olfaction."
 Watt W. Webb (2010)
"For pioneering the applications of rigorous physical principles to the development of optical tools that have broadly impacted our ability to examine biological systems."
 Barry H. Honig (2007)
 "For pioneering theoretical and computational studies of electrostatic interactions in biological macromolecules and of the energetics of protein folding."
 Carlos J. Bustamante (2004)
"For his ingenious use of atomic force microscopy and laser tweezers to study the biophysical properties of proteins, DNA, and RNA, one molecule at a time."
  (2001)
"For his development of three-dimensional image reconstruction methods, which have revolutionized electron microscopy of subcellular structures, and his analytical visualization of cellular motility mechanisms."
 Wayne A. Hendrickson (1998)
"For his contributions to macromolecular crystallography, in the development of robust methods of phasing and refinement, and in determination of complex and biologically important structures."

See also

 List of biology awards
 List of physics awards
 Prizes named after people

References

Awards established in 1998
Biophysics awards
Awards of the United States National Academy of Sciences
1998 establishments in the United States